Alan R. Wilson is a Canadian novelist and poet, who won the Amazon.ca First Novel Award in 1999 for his novel Before the Flood. The novel was also a shortlisted nominee for the Ethel Wilson Fiction Prize and the Stephen Leacock Award.

His prior publications include the poetry collections Animate Objects (1995), Counting to 100 (1996) and Sky Atlas (2008).

Originally from Moncton, New Brunswick, he currently resides in Victoria, British Columbia. His second novel, Lucifer's Hair, has been completed and is slated for future publication.

References

20th-century Canadian poets
Canadian male poets
21st-century Canadian poets
20th-century Canadian novelists
21st-century Canadian novelists
Canadian male novelists
Writers from Moncton
Writers from Victoria, British Columbia
Living people
Year of birth missing (living people)
20th-century Canadian male writers
21st-century Canadian male writers
Amazon.ca First Novel Award winners